The Borough Hall/Court Street station is an underground New York City Subway station complex shared by the BMT Fourth Avenue Line, the IRT Broadway–Seventh Avenue Line and the IRT Eastern Parkway Line. The complex comprises three stations: Borough Hall on the IRT lines and Court Street on the BMT line. Located at the intersection of Court, Joralemon and Montague Streets at the border of Downtown Brooklyn and Brooklyn Heights, it is served by the 2, 4 and R trains at all times; the 3 train all times except late nights; the 5 train on weekdays the N train during late nights; and limited rush hour W trains.

The Borough Hall station of the Eastern Parkway Line was built for the Interborough Rapid Transit Company (IRT) as part of the city's first subway line. The station opened on January 9, 1908, as part of an extension of the original IRT into Brooklyn. The Borough Hall station of the Broadway–Seventh Avenue Line opened on April 15, 1919, as part of the Dual Contracts. The Court Street station of the Fourth Avenue Line was built for the Brooklyn Rapid Transit Company (later the Brooklyn–Manhattan Transit Corporation, or BMT) as part of the Dual Contracts, and opened on August 1, 1920. Several modifications have been made to both stations over the years, and they were connected within a single fare control area in 1948.

The Eastern Parkway Line station under Joralemon Street has two side platforms and two tracks on the same level. The Broadway–Seventh Avenue Line station under Brooklyn Borough Hall also has two side platforms and two tracks, but with the platforms on different levels. The Fourth Avenue Line station has one island platform and two tracks. Part of the complex is compliant with the Americans with Disabilities Act of 1990. The original portion of the interior of the Eastern Parkway Line's Borough Hall station is a New York City designated landmark and listed on the National Register of Historic Places.

History

First subway 
Planning for a subway line in New York City dates to 1864. However, development of what would become the city's first subway line did not start until 1894, when the New York State Legislature authorized the Rapid Transit Act. The subway plans were drawn up by a team of engineers led by William Barclay Parsons, chief engineer of the Rapid Transit Commission. The Rapid Transit Construction Company, organized by John B. McDonald and funded by August Belmont Jr., signed the initial Contract 1 with the Rapid Transit Commission in February 1900, in which it would construct the subway and maintain a 50-year operating lease from the opening of the line. In 1901, the firm of Heins & LaFarge was hired to design the underground stations. Belmont incorporated the Interborough Rapid Transit Company (IRT) in April 1902 to operate the subway.

Several days after Contract 1 was signed, the Board of Rapid Transit Railroad Commissioners instructed Parsons to evaluate the feasibility of extending the subway south to South Ferry, and then to Brooklyn. On January 24, 1901, the Board adopted a route that would extend the subway from City Hall to the Long Island Rail Road (LIRR)'s Flatbush Avenue terminal station (now known as Atlantic Terminal) in Brooklyn, via the Joralemon Street Tunnel under the East River. Contract 2, giving a lease of 35 years, was executed between the commission and the Rapid Transit Construction Company on September 11, 1902. Construction began at State Street in Manhattan on November 8, 1902. Construction of the Joralemon Street Tunnel began in 1903.

The Borough Hall station was the first underground subway station in Brooklyn. It opened on January 9, 1908, as the terminal for the extension of the IRT Lexington Avenue Line from Lower Manhattan. The extension to Atlantic Avenue opened on May 1, 1908, completing the Contract 2 IRT line. Initially, the station was served by express trains along both the West Side (now the Broadway–Seventh Avenue Line to Van Cortlandt Park–242nd Street) and East Side (now the Lenox Avenue Line). The express trains, running to Atlantic Avenue, had their northern terminus at 242nd Street or West Farms (180th Street). Lenox local trains to 145th Street served the station during late nights.

To address overcrowding, in 1909, the New York Public Service Commission proposed lengthening platforms at stations along the original IRT subway. As part of a modification to the IRT's construction contracts, made on January 18, 1910, the company was to lengthen station platforms  to accommodate ten-car express and six-car local trains. In addition to $1.5 million (equivalent to $ million in ) spent on platform lengthening, $500,000 was spent on building additional entrances and exits. It was anticipated that these improvements would increase capacity by 25 percent. The northbound platform at the Borough Hall station was extended  to the east, while the southbound platform was extended  to the east. On January 23, 1911, ten-car express trains began running on the East Side Line, and the next day, ten-car express trains began running on the West Side Line.

Dual Contracts 
After the original IRT opened, the city began planning new lines. In 1913, as part of the Dual Contracts, the New York City Public Service Commission planned to split the original IRT system into three segments: two north-south lines, carrying through trains over the Lexington Avenue and Broadway–Seventh Avenue Lines, and a west-east shuttle under 42nd Street. This would form a roughly "H"-shaped system. The Broadway–Seventh Avenue Line would split into two branches south of Chambers Street, one of which would turn eastward through Lower Manhattan, run under the East River via a new Clark Street Tunnel, and connect with the existing Contract 2 IRT Brooklyn Line at Borough Hall. Construction of the Clark Street Tunnel began in 1914.

The Lexington Avenue Line north of Grand Central–42nd Street opened on August 1, 1918, and all Eastern Parkway Line services were sent via the Lexington Avenue Line. Less than a year later, on April 15, 1919, the Broadway–Seventh Avenue Line station opened when the Brooklyn branch of that line was extended from Wall Street in Manhattan to Atlantic Avenue in Brooklyn. Through service between the Brooklyn Line and the Broadway–Seventh Avenue Line was inaugurated with this extension. In 1920, a project to construct a new entrance at the northwestern corner of Joralemon Street and Court Street was completed. That year, the Eastern Parkway Line was extended east of Atlantic Avenue. The Joralemon Street Tunnel services, which had previously served all stops on the Eastern Parkway Line, became express services, while the Broadway–Seventh Avenue Line services ran local on the Eastern Parkway Line.

Also planned under the Dual Contracts was the Broadway Line and Fourth Avenue Line of the Brooklyn Rapid Transit Company (BRT), subsequently the Brooklyn–Manhattan Transit Corporation (BMT). Under the Dual Contracts, the Whitehall–Montague Street route and the Montague Street Tunnel were to be built, connecting the Broadway Line in Manhattan and the Fourth Avenue subway under the Flatbush Avenue Extension to the west of the DeKalb Avenue station. Construction of the tunnel began in 1914. Service via the Montague Tunnel began on August 1, 1920, along with the opening of the Court Street station.

Later years
The city government took over the BMT's operations on June 1, 1940, and the IRT's operations on June 12, 1940. Transfer passageways between the three stations were placed inside fare control on July 1, 1948. The Eastern Parkway Line platforms were extended eastward in 1964, allowing the station to accommodate 10-car trains.

In 1976, with funding from the Exxon Corporation, the Broadway–Seventh Avenue Line station, as well as three others citywide, received new "artfully humorous graffiti" murals and artwork. Local designer Samuel Lebowitz received $5,000 to "improve the level of lighting in an exciting and light hearted way." Some "multicolored animated neon signs" were placed underneath transparent plastic screens; such signs included "an abstract eye that winks every five seconds" and another that looked to be "blow[ing] smoke rings." In 1982, the Urban Mass Transportation Administration gave a $66 million grant to the New York City Transit Authority. Part of the grant was to be used for the renovation of several subway stations, including Borough Hall's IRT platforms.

On weekdays between August 2, 2013 and September 15, 2014, this station served as the northern terminal of the Brooklyn half of the divided R. Service ran in two sections: one section between Forest Hills and Whitehall Street–South Ferry, and the other between Court Street-Borough Hall and Bay Ridge–95th Street. This change was necessary to repair damage on the Montague Street Tunnel resulting from Hurricane Sandy.

In June 2018, part of the Eastern Parkway Line station's ceiling collapsed, injuring a bystander. The collapse necessitated expensive emergency repairs that would set the MTA back $8.3 million. A report found that the staff sent to inspect the station verified the defect existed in 2017, but underestimated its severity due to a lack of expertise in terracotta ceilings, nor was the issue escalated to engineers who were familiar with terracotta. The ceiling was over 100 years old. The MTA report suggested that special care be taken in the inspection of the thirteen subway stations that have terracotta ceilings due to the different properties when compared to concrete or steel. In November 2022, the MTA announced that it would award a $106 million contract for the installation of additional elevators at the Borough Hall station complex, making the Eastern Parkway Line platforms fully accessible. The contract included one elevator from the mezzanine to either of the Eastern Parkway Line platforms, as well as one elevator from the mezzanine to the street.

Station layout 

There are three overpasses of the IRT Eastern Parkway Line platforms at the mezzanine level above the center of that station.  The outer two overpasses have two fare control areas, one each on the north and south sides. The middle overpass is apassageway connecting the unpaid areas on the north and south sides, and has no access to the platforms. The central mezzanine has two bronze plaques commemorating the subway's arrival in Brooklyn: a plaque to the PSC on the west and a plaque celebrating the station's opening on the east. The plaques are installed within mosaic tablets with swag and floral designs. A fourth overpass is at the extreme west end of the IRT Eastern Parkway Line platforms.

The center of the northbound Eastern Parkway Line platform has a passageway leading to the southern end of the northbound IRT Broadway–Seventh Avenue Line platform. At the northern end of the IRT Broadway–Seventh Avenue Line platform, there is another mezzanine above the upper platform level. This leads to the BMT platform and two public restrooms inside fare control. Two escalators and two staircases from this passageway go down to a landing above the eastern part of the platform.

The BMT Fourth Avenue Line platform has another exit at its extreme western end. From a landing above the platform, two elevators and a staircase go up to the western BMT mezzanine. The mezzanine has a part-time turnstile bank and customer assistance booth. Full height turnstiles provide entrance/exit from the mezzanine at all times.

Both Broadway–Seventh Avenue Line platforms are fully accessible under the Americans with Disabilities Act of 1990 (ADA). The northbound Eastern Parkway Line platform is ADA-accessible via the passageway connecting with the northbound Broadway–Seventh Avenue Line platform. However, the southbound Eastern Parkway Line platform and the Fourth Avenue Line platform are not accessible. Accessibility for the southbound Eastern Parkway Line platform was proposed in February 2019 as part of the MTA's "Fast Forward" program.

Exits 
The main fare control for the IRT Broadway–Seventh Avenue Line and BMT Fourth Avenue Line platforms is at the west end of the platforms. Outside fare control, there is a token booth, two staircases going up to the southeast corner of Court and Montague Streets, and a staircase and elevator going up to Columbus Park, the entrance plaza of Brooklyn Borough Hall, on the east side of Court Street.

The main fare control for the IRT Eastern Parkway Line platforms is at the center of the station. On the northbound side, the overpasses have full height turnstiles leading to two staircases, one each flanking Borough Hall's main entrance on the northeast corner of Court and Joralemon Streets. The stairs flanking Borough Hall retain cast-iron hoods atop granite bases, which are part of the original design. The Borough Hall station is one of two stations to retain such hoods, the other being the Wall Street station in Manhattan. On the southbound side, the overpasses have small turnstile banks, leading to a token booth and two staircases, going up to the southeast corner of Court and Joralemon Streets.  The banisters on these staircases are made of concrete since they are outside the Brooklyn Municipal Building. The mezzanine has a large set of doors leading into the Municipal Building (this entrance was closed in February 1996 due to security concerns), and a now defunct bank teller window. On the northwest corner of the mezzanine, a passage led to Borough Hall.

The secondary fare control area for the IRT Eastern Parkway Line is at the extreme west end. Outside fare control, there is a token booth. Past the booth, one stair each goes up to the northwest and southwest corners of Court and Joralemon Streets.

The unstaffed fare control area for the BMT Fourth Avenue Line is at the extreme west end. Outside fare control, two staircases go up to either western corner of Livingston and Court Streets. The northwest staircase has an antique "SUBWAY" white and green globe sign since it is in the front yard of St. Ann's and Holy Trinity Church (the mezzanine has a mosaic sign with the church's name on it). The southwest staircase is next to the basement entrance of a Kiddie Korner daycare.

IRT Broadway–Seventh Avenue Line platforms 

The Borough Hall station on the IRT Broadway–Seventh Avenue Line has two levels. Each level has one track with a side platform on the south side. Manhattan-bound trains use the upper level while southbound trains use the lower one. The 2 train stops here at all times, while the 3 train stops here at all times except late nights. The IRT Broadway–Seventh Avenue Line platforms are connected by stairs, an escalator, and an elevator. At the eastern end of both platforms, a staircase from the lower level goes up to the upper level, near the passageway to the northbound IRT Eastern Parkway Line platform. At the western end of both platforms, a staircase from the lower level goes up to the upper level before another staircase goes up to a mezzanine. The lower level also has an up-only escalator that bypasses the upper level, leading directly to the mezzanine. A single elevator stops at all three levels.

At the eastern (railroad south) end of the platforms, the southbound track crosses under the tracks of the Eastern Parkway Line, and both tracks become the local tracks for the line.

Design
Both platforms have their original IRT trim line and name tablets reading "BOROUGH HALL" in a serif lettering style. Tablets showing images of Borough Hall are located at regular intervals on the trim line. Dark blue I-beam columns line both platforms at regular intervals with alternating ones having the standard black station name plate in white lettering.

IRT Eastern Parkway Line platforms 

The Borough Hall station on the IRT Eastern Parkway Line has two tracks and two side platforms. The 4 train stops here at all times, while the 5 train stops here at all times except late nights. Two staircases from each platform lead to each of the two overpasses at the center of the station, while one staircase from each platform leads to the overpass at the extreme west end.

In 1979, the New York City Landmarks Preservation Commission designated the space within the boundaries of the original station, excluding expansions made after 1904, as a city landmark. The station was designated along with eleven others on the original IRT. The original interiors were listed on the National Register of Historic Places in 2004.

East of this station, the two tracks become the express tracks of the IRT Eastern Parkway Line and the two tracks of the IRT Broadway–Seventh Avenue Line become the local tracks.

Design

As with other stations built as part of the original IRT, the station was constructed using a cut-and-cover method. The tunnel is covered by a "U"-shaped trough that contains utility pipes and wires. Each platform consists of  concrete slabs, beneath which are drainage basins. The platforms contain green I-beam columns, spaced every . Additional columns between the tracks, spaced every , support the jack-arched concrete station roofs. The ceiling height varies based on whether there are utilities in the ceiling. There is a  gap between the trough wall and the platform walls, which are made of -thick brick covered over by a tiled finish.

The walls along the platforms consist of a pink marble wainscoting on the lowest part of the wall, with bronze air vents along the wainscoting, and white glass tiles above. The platform walls are divided at  intervals by green and rose pilasters, or vertical bands, with brown and buff-colored swags. In the original portion of the station, each pilaster is topped by blue, green, and yellow faience plaques with the letters "BH". White-on-green tile plaques with the words "Borough Hall", containing red, green, blue, buff, violet, and pink mosaic borders, are also placed on the walls. The platform extensions contain similar decorative elements. The ceilings contain plaster molding.

At the extreme east end of the platforms, where they were extended in the 1950s to accommodate the current standard "A" Division train length, there is a brown trim line on beige tiles with "BOROUGH HALL" in white sans serif lettering.

BMT Fourth Avenue Line platform 

The Court Street station on the BMT Fourth Avenue Line has two tracks and one island platform. The R stops here at all times; some rush-hour W trains stop here; and the N stops here during late nights. A single staircase from the western end of the platform goes up to the elevators to the western BMT mezzanine. Two staircases from the eastern end of the platform go up to the escalators and stairs to the IRT passageway.

West of the station, the line goes through the Montague Street Tunnel under the East River to connect to the BMT Broadway Line and the BMT Nassau Street Line. All trains use the former connection; the latter was last used by the M train in June 2010 before it was rerouted to run via the IND Sixth Avenue Line.

Design
Since the tunnel descends to go underneath the East River, it was constructed with a deep-bore tunnel, making both track walls curved. The walls also still have their original Dual Contracts mosaic tablets and trim line. The name tablets have "COURT ST." in serif lettering, and tablets showing scenes of Borough Hall are located along the trim line at regular intervals. The western end (railroad north) of the walls is plain white. Yellow I-beam columns line both sides of the island platform at regular intervals with alternating ones having the standard black station name plate in white lettering. Some of these show the name "Carnegie", from Carnegie Steel (predecessor of United States Steel).

Image gallery

Surface connections 
In 1916, a single-track counterclockwise trolley loop was built around Borough Hall with both ends at Joralemon Street and access from westbound Fulton Street to the loop and from the loop to southbound Court Street. Passengers on lines that used the loop, Court Street, or Fulton Street could transfer to the entrance of this station complex bounded by those two streets and the loop, north of Borough Hall. The lines that used this loop included:
 Flatbush–Prospect Park Line to Prospect Park
 Flatbush–Seventh Avenue Line to Greenwood Cemetery and the Ninth Avenue Depot
 Hicks Street Line to Erie Basin
 Rogers Avenue Line to Flatbush
 St. Johns Place Line to Ocean Hill
 Third Avenue Line to Fort Hamilton
 16th Avenue Line to New Utrecht

There were other lines that passed Borough Hall and thus served the station. On Court Street, such lines included:
 Court Street Line to Gowanus
 Flatbush Avenue Line to Bergen Beach
 Greenpoint Line to Greenpoint (also on Joralemon Street)
 Montague Street Line to Wall Street Ferry
 Union Street Line to Greenwood Cemetery, Ninth Avenue Depot, and Coney Island

On Fulton Street:
 DeKalb Avenue Line to Ridgewood
 Fulton Street Line to Cypress Hills
 Greene and Gates Avenues Line to Ridgewood
 Myrtle Avenue Line to Ridgewood
 Putnam Avenue Line to Ridgewood

On Joralemon Street:
 Crosstown Line to Erie Basin and Long Island City
 Erie Basin Line to Erie Basin

On April 7, 1930, the Brooklyn–Manhattan Transit Corporation eliminated the loop to relieve congestion. Several lines were moved to a loop on Washington Street north of Tillary Street or a clockwise loop on Livingston Street, Court Street, Joralemon Street, Fulton Street, and Boerum Place.

References

Further reading 
 Lee Stokey. Subway Ceramics: A History and Iconography. 1994. .

External links 

 
 
 
  (includes current and former track configurations, and provisions for future connections)

IRT Broadway–Seventh Avenue Line stations
IRT Eastern Parkway Line stations
BMT Fourth Avenue Line stations
New York City Subway transfer stations
Railway and subway stations on the National Register of Historic Places in New York City
New York City Subway stations in Brooklyn
Railway stations in the United States opened in 1920
1920 establishments in New York City
Downtown Brooklyn
Brooklyn Heights
National Register of Historic Places in Brooklyn